Tracy Mpati Bibuangu (born 21 March 1992) is a Belgian footballer who plays for Francs Borains in the Belgian National Division 1 as a right back.

Club career
Tracy Mpati started his career with White Star Bruxelles.

In May 2020, it was announced that Mpati had signed a two-year contract with an option for an additional year with RWDM, after his former club Lokeren had folded.

Personal life
Mpati was born in Belgium and is of Congolese descent.

References

1992 births
Living people
Association football fullbacks
Belgian footballers
Footballers from Brussels
Belgian people of Democratic Republic of the Congo descent
K.R.C. Mechelen players
K.S.C. Lokeren Oost-Vlaanderen players
RWDM47 players
Francs Borains players
Belgian Pro League players
Challenger Pro League players